The Governor of Amur Oblast is the head of the executive branch of the government of Amur Oblast, a federal subject (an oblast) of Russia.

The current governor is Vasily Orlov, who has held the position since 30 May 2018.

List of governors
This is a list of governors of Amur Oblast:

Elections

2018

2015 
Results of the 13 September 2015 election for the office.

References

Sources 
World Statesmen.org

 
Politics of Amur Oblast
Amur Oblast